Manuel Antonio Rodriguez Sr. (January 1, 1912 – May 6, 2017), also known by his nickname Mang Maning, was a Filipino printmaker. He was one of the pioneers of printmaking in the Philippines and was dubbed as the "Father of Philippine Printmaking". Rodriguez was also the first Filipino to have exhibited his prints in biennial shows held outside the country. He also established the Philippine Association of Printmakers in 1968.

References

1912 births
2017 deaths
Filipino centenarians
Men centenarians
Filipino artists
Artists from Cebu
University of the Philippines alumni
Filipino printmakers
20th-century Filipino artists
21st-century Filipino artists